Impatient Vivek is a 2011 Hindi language romantic comedy film, directed by Rahat Kazmi and produced by Ashok Chauhan & Malvee S. It released under the Search Film banner. The film was the first Bollywood release of 2011, alongside No One Killed Jessica, on 7 January.

Cast
 Vivek Sudarshan as iV
 Sayali Bhagat as Shruti
 Hrishikesh Joshi as Jaggi
 Charu Asopa as Rani
 Rounaog Ahuja as Annu
 Muni Jha
 Pratik Dixit
 Nirmal Soni
 Ashok Beniwal
 R. P. Singh
 Kirti Kapoor
 Vijay Bhatia
 Sharmila Goenka
 Anurag Saxena
 Zia A. Khan
 Denzil Smith as Rameshwar

Soundtrack
The music is composed by Neeraj Shrivastava, Raja Ali, Shahdaab Bhartiya, Aanamik. Lyrics are penned Neeraj Shrivastava, Rahat Kazmi, Nusrat Badr, Sanjay Mishra, Aamir Ali, Binish Khan.

Track listing

Box office
Film was made on budget of 5 crore but
At the box office, it collected a total of just Rs. 17 crore and was declared a hit.

References

External links
 
 

2010s Hindi-language films
Indian romantic comedy films
2011 romantic comedy films
2011 films